John Davies or Davis was an English footballer who played in goal for Burslem Port Vale and Newton Heath in the 19th century.

Career
He played for Hurst before joining Burslem Port Vale in the summer of 1889. He made his debut in a friendly with Halliwell on 2 September 1889, the match finishing 1–1. A regular between the sticks he became the first known Vale player to be sent off, after he retaliated against a Walsall Town Swifts opponent who kicked him in a 5–1 'friendly' home win on 3 May 1890. He started to become unreliable and lost his place in January 1891, before being released the following year.

In July 1892, he joined Newton Heath, making his debut in a 3–1 defeat to Nottingham Forest at North Road on 14 January 1893. He played a further six league and one FA Cup game for the club before he left later that year.

Career statistics
Source:

References

Year of birth missing
Year of death missing
English footballers
Association football goalkeepers
Ashton United F.C. players
Manchester United F.C. players
Port Vale F.C. players
English Football League players